Marcus Per Eriksson (born 5 December 1993) is a Swedish professional basketball player for Alba Berlin of the Basketball Bundesliga.

Early career
A native of Uppsala, Sweden, Eriksson left his country in 2010, to further his career at Bàsquet Manresa, in Spain. As a member of Manresa's youth team, he became the MVP of the L’Hospitalet's Junior Tournament in 2010, at the age of 16.

Professional career

Europe
Eriksson made his professional debut in Spain's top-flight league, the ACB, with Manresa's senior men's team during the 2010–11 season. In 2011, he was signed by Spanish club FC Barcelona ("Barça"), and in his first years with Barcelona, he mainly played for their developmental farm team, FC Barcelona B. He returned to Manresa for the 2013–14 campaign, joining them on loan from Barcelona, before later heading back to Barça. 

Eriksson missed the 2014–15 season, because of a torn ACL and torn meniscus.

NBA draft right
On 25 June 2015 Eriksson was selected with the 50th pick of the 2015 NBA draft, by the Atlanta Hawks.

National team
Eriksson was involved with the Swedish junior national teams for a number of years. With Sweden's junior national teams, he played at the 2009 FIBA Europe Under-16 Championship (Division B), the 2010 FIBA Europe Under-18 Championship, the 2012 FIBA Europe Under-20 Championship, and the 2013 FIBA Europe Under-20 Championship. In 2012, he had his first official appearance with the Swedish senior squad.

Career statistics

Domestic leagues

References

External links
 Marcus Eriksson at acb.com 
 Marcus Eriksson at draftexpress.com
 Marcus Eriksson at eurobasket.com
 Marcus Eriksson at euroleague.net
 Marcus Eriksson at fiba.com (archive)

1993 births
Living people
Alba Berlin players
Atlanta Hawks draft picks
Bàsquet Manresa players
CB Gran Canaria players
FC Barcelona Bàsquet players
Liga ACB players
Shooting guards
Small forwards
Swedish expatriate basketball people in Germany
Swedish expatriate basketball people in Spain
Swedish men's basketball players
Sportspeople from Uppsala